John Harms (April 29, 1925 – January 5, 2003) was a professional ice hockey player of Cree heritage who played 43 games in the National Hockey League (NHL). He played for the Chicago Black Hawks.

References

External links
 

1925 births
2003 deaths
Canadian ice hockey right wingers
Chicago Blackhawks players
Ice hockey people from Saskatchewan
Sportspeople from Saskatoon
First Nations sportspeople